R v Burlingham, [1995] 2 S.C.R. 206 is a leading decision on the Supreme Court of Canada on the right to counsel under section 10(b) of the Canadian Charter of Rights and Freedoms and the exclusion of evidence under section 24(2).

Background
Terrence Burlingham was arrested for the October 1984 murders of Denean Worms and Brenda Hughes in Cranbrook, British Columbia. Over a period of four days, he was interrogated by police despite his continued request to see a lawyer. During the interrogation, the police suggested that his parents would be hurt by delaying things and made disparaging remarks about the accused's lawyer. The police later offered to reduce the charge to second degree murder if Burlingham were willing to disclose the location of the murder weapon. Eventually, he agreed and took them to the location where he had hidden the gun that was used to kill Hughes.  The crown, however, had not consented to the deal and did not follow through with the bargain. The trial judge found that the deal was an honest mistake. However, since Burlingham did not have access to a lawyer, his rights under section 10(b) were violated. Despite the violation, the murder weapon and several incriminating statements were still admitted.  Burlingham was convicted of first degree murder.

The British Columbia Court of Appeal upheld the decision with McEachern C.J. in dissent.

Opinion of the Court
In a six to one decision, the Court found that the evidence should be excluded under section 24(2) of the Charter and overturned the conviction.

On the matter of the use of section 24(2) Iacobucci emphasized:

See also
 List of Supreme Court of Canada cases

External links
 

Canadian Charter of Rights and Freedoms case law
Supreme Court of Canada cases
1995 in Canadian case law